Rudolf Bindig (born on 6 September 1940 in Goslar, Lower Saxony) is a German politician who was elected eight times from 1976 to 2005 as a member of the Bundestag for the Social Democratic Party of Germany. From 1996 to 2005 he was also a member (and from 1988 to 1996 an alternate member) of the Parliamentary Assembly of the Council of Europe, of which he was elected a vice-president in 2002.

Sources

Members of the Bundestag for Baden-Württemberg
Members of the Bundestag 2002–2005
Members of the Bundestag 1998–2002
Members of the Bundestag 1994–1998
1940 births
Living people
Members of the Bundestag for the Social Democratic Party of Germany